Basra is the debut album by drummer Pete La Roca, recorded in 1965 and released on the Blue Note label.

Background and recording
Bassist Steve Swallow recounted that he and La Roca had taken LSD prior to traveling to recording engineer Rudy Van Gelder's New Jersey studio for the session. He also said that Van Gelder threatened to end the session after pianist Steve Kuhn started manually plucking the piano strings.

Reception
The Allmusic review by Scott Yanow stated: "It is strange to realize that drummer Pete La Roca only led two albums during the prime years of his career, for this CD reissue of his initial date is a classic".

Track listing
All compositions by Pete La Roca except as noted
 "Malagueña" (Ernesto Lecuona) - 9:01
 "Candu" - 6:45
 "Tears Come from Heaven" - 5:00
 "Basra" - 9:58
 "Lazy Afternoon" (John La Touche, Jerome Moross) - 5:31
 "Eiderdown" (Steve Swallow) - 4:28

Personnel
Pete La Roca - drums
Joe Henderson - tenor saxophone
Steve Kuhn - piano
Steve Swallow - bass

References

Blue Note Records albums
Pete La Roca albums
1965 albums
Albums recorded at Van Gelder Studio
Albums produced by Alfred Lion